The National First Division (NFD), officially known as the Motsepe Foundation Championship for sponsorship reasons, is the second-highest league of South African club football after the South African Premier Division. Both the NFD and South African Premier Division  are organised by the Premier Soccer League.

Structure and rules

Seasons 2007–2011
The restructured NFD was divided into two streams, one inland and another coastal – each of which consisted of 8 teams. The winners of the two streams played against each other in a 'final' at the end of the season – the winner of which was promoted to the PSL. The loser of the 'final' played in a mini-tournament/play-offs against the two second-placed teams in each stream and the 15th-placed team on the PSL log. The winner of this tournament was also be automatically promoted to the top flight.

Inland provinces
 Gauteng
 Limpopo
 Free State
 Mpumalanga
 North West

Coastal provinces
 Eastern Cape
 KwaZulu-Natal
 Northern Cape
 Western Cape

Season 2011 onwards
A new structure and new rules were decided, beginning from the 2011-12 season. The new rules are, that competing NFD teams, at all times during NFD matches, are required to field: 
 Minimum 5 South African-born under 23 players.
 Maximum 3 foreign players.

The new structure of the league, is a re-introduction of the one division format, previously used for the three seasons in 2004-07. This means, that the two former geographical split streams, will merge into one common division. The winner of the NFD will gain automatic promotion to PSL (replacing the lowest ranked team in PSL). Teams to finish 2nd and 3rd in NFD, will enter a playoff stage with a round robin format, against the team ranked as nr.15 in PSL. Only the winner of this playoff stage, will also get promoted to PSL.

Relegation/promotion rules between NFD and Vodacom League remain more or less unchanged. Meaning that after each season, the two lowest ranked teams in NFD will be automatically relegated to Vodacom League. In the opposite direction, the two best teams of Vodacom League will get promoted to NFD, decided by a round robin playoff stage between the 9 provincial winners.

History

The first non-racial second level of South African football, was established in March 1987 as the OK League. This league served as the competing place, for promotion/relegation to and from the topflight NSL. In the former years from 1978–1986, a topflight non-racial First Level had already been established, after the merger of the NFL and NPSL, to form the new common topflight NPSL. In the early years from 1978–1986 relegation/promotion to and from the topflight league, according to official records actually did happen, but apparently it happened from a Second Level league structure, still divided into whites/blacks/coloureds.

When the new topflight Premier Soccer League was established in 1996, the organizers at the same time for the Second Level, replaced the former OK League with the new National First Division. Apart from being covered by a better sponsor deal, the most significant change -both at the First and Second Level- was to change the fixtures from yearly seasons, into the more Internationally adapted: September–May football season.

The first sponsors were United Bank who sponsored the league in 1997 and 1998. From November 1998 until the end of the 2001/2001 season, the league was sponsored by MTN. It was reported that MTN withdrew from sponsorship the First Division as they were unhappy with their treatment from the PSL - the division organisers. MTN had been rebuffed by the PSL in their efforts to sponsor the PSL-organised Charity Cup because Orlando Pirates and Kaizer Chiefs would refuse to play in the tournament as the two clubs were sponsored by MTN's telecommunication rivals, Vodacom. The First Division could not find a new sponsor until May 2004.

From 2004 until 2007 the league was sponsored by business magnate Tokyo Sexwale's Mvelaphanda Group and known as Mvela Golden League. For those three seasons, there was no geographical split and all 16 teams played in one division. The league has been unable to find a sponsor since 2007.

In regards of all other previous seasons, there was a geographical split into two or four streams. The National First Division re-introduced the structure with no geographical split from the 2011–12 season.

Notes

See also
Nedbank Cup

References

External links
National First Division Official Website
Premier Soccer League Official Website
National First Division section at psl.co.za
South African Football Association (SAFA)
Confederation of African Football (CAF)

 
2
South
Professional sports leagues in South Africa